Abdulaziz Fallatah  (born December 28, 1985) is a Saudi football player who plays as a midfielder .

References

1985 births
Living people
Saudi Arabian footballers
Al Nassr FC players
Al-Orobah FC players
Al-Faisaly FC players
Al-Taawoun FC players
Al-Qadsiah FC players
Al-Wehda Club (Mecca) players
Hajer FC players
Jeddah Club players
Bisha FC players
Place of birth missing (living people)
Saudi First Division League players
Saudi Professional League players
Saudi Second Division players
Association football midfielders